Timothy White is an American photographer of celebrities, ranging from Harrison Ford, Brad Pitt, Nicolas Cage, Will Smith, Queen Latifah, and Julia Roberts to Eric Clapton, Outkast, and Keith Richards. He lives and works in Los Angeles.

Biography 
After his graduation from Rhode Island School of Design in 1979, White moved to New York City, where he began career as a photographer. Though initially focused on shooting portraits for young musicians and actors, the 40 trips White took to South America over the course of four years on travel assignments would ultimately give the photographer his first major successes. "I was very interested in doing music and Hollywood and moving into lots of younger magazines like Guitar and little pop magazines. I marched some of my South American work to Rolling Stone and won an assignment to do Yoko Ono," White says.

White has since contributed to the covers of magazines such as Vanity Fair, Rolling Stone, Esquire, and Playboy, as well as hundreds of movie posters for Hollywood's studios, including Sony, Paramount and Universal. His work has also been seen on album covers for musicians such as Bruce Springsteen, Aretha Franklin, and Jon Bon Jovi. Named "one of the most influential people in photography" by American Photo magazine, White is the recipient of such awards as the Lucie Foundation's 2004 "International Photographer of the Year" and a spot in the New Jersey Hall of Fame. ​

Several books of White's work have been published: Timothy White: Portraits (published by Rizzoli); Indian Larry (published by Merrell); and Hollywood Pinups (HarperCollins). White has also directed music videos, television commercials and major ad campaigns for brands such as Kiehl's, Bravo, and Got Milk?.

Timothy White has been honored for his pro bono work for City Harvest, the ACLU, and Riverkeeper. The Newark Museum opened its gallery in the summer of 2003 with a retrospective installation of White's work. White, who is an avid car collector, also photographs automobiles.

Relocating his studio to Los Angeles in 2013, White parlayed his representation by Morrison Hotel Gallery, the international leader in fine art music photography, into a partnership when he oversaw the opening of the gallery's West Hollywood outpost located within the historic Sunset Marquis Hotel.

Bibliography 
 Timothy White: Portraits, Rizzoli, 2001 
 Indian Larry, Merrell, 2006 
 Hollywood Pinups, HarperCollins, 2008

References

External links 

 Timothy White - Official Website
 Putting the focus on Timothy White 2018 Portray interview

Living people
Rhode Island School of Design alumni
American photographers
1956 births